Hopea pentanervia is a tree in the family Dipterocarpaceae, native to Borneo. The specific epithet pentanervia means "five-nerved", referring to the species' five pairs of leaf veins.

Description
The bark is cracked and flaked.

Distribution and habitat
Hopea pentanervia is endemic to Borneo.

Conservation
Hopea pentanervia has been assessed as vulnerable on the IUCN Red List. It is threatened by land conversion for palm oil plantations and for other agriculture and industry. It is also threatened by logging for its timber. The species is found in some protected areas.

References

pentanervia
Endemic flora of Borneo
Plants described in 1960
Taxonomy articles created by Polbot